Huckleberry is a name used in North America for several plants in the family Ericaceae, in two closely related genera: Vaccinium and Gaylussacia. The huckleberry is the state fruit of Idaho.

Nomenclature
The name 'huckleberry' is a North American variation of the English dialectal name variously called 'hurtleberry' or 'whortleberry' for the bilberry. In North America, the name was applied to numerous plant variations, all bearing small berries with colors that may be red, blue, or black. It is the common name for various Gaylussacia species, and some Vaccinium species, such as Vaccinium parvifolium, the red huckleberry, and is also applied to other Vaccinium species which may also be called blueberries depending upon local custom, as in New England and parts of Appalachia.

Taxonomy

Gaylussacia

Four species of huckleberries in the genus Gaylussacia are common in eastern North America, especially G. baccata, also known as the black huckleberry.

Vaccinium
From coastal Central California through Oregon to southern Washington and British Columbia, the red huckleberry (V. parvifolium) is found in the maritime-influenced plant community. Huckleberry was one of the few plant species to survive on the slopes of Mount St. Helens when the volcano erupted in 1980, and existed as a prominent mountain-slope bush in 2017.

Where the climate is favorable, certain species of huckleberry, such as V. membranaceum, V. parvifolium and V. deliciosum, are used in ornamental plantings. The 'garden huckleberry' (Solanum scabrum) is not a true huckleberry, but is instead a member of the nightshade family.

Habitat and cultivation
Huckleberries grow wild on subalpine slopes, forests, bogs, and lake basins of the northwestern United States and western Canada. The plant has shallow, radiating roots topped by a bush growing from an underground stem. Attempts to cultivate huckleberry plants from seeds have failed, with plants devoid of fruits. This may be due to the inability of the plants to fully root and replicate the native soil chemistry of wild plants.

Use as food or traditional medicine
Huckleberries were traditionally collected by Native American and First Nations people along the Pacific coast, interior British Columbia, Idaho, and Montana for use as food or traditional medicine. The berries are small and round,  in diameter, and look like large dark blueberries. In taste, they may be tart, with a flavor similar to that of a blueberry, especially in blue- and purple-colored varieties and some have noticeably larger, bitter seeds. The fruit is versatile in various foods or beverages, including jam, pudding, candy, pie, ice cream, muffins, pancakes, salad dressings, juice, tea, soup, and syrup.

Phytochemicals

Two huckleberry species, V. membranaceum and V. ovatum, were studied for phytochemical content, showing that V. ovatum had greater total anthocyanin and polyphenols than did V. membranaceum. Each species contained 15 anthocyanins (galactoside, glucoside, and arabinoside of delphinidin, cyanidin, petunidin, peonidin, and malvidin) but in different proportions.

In popular culture

Huckleberry "Huck" Finn is a fictional character in the books The Adventures of Tom Sawyer (1876) and Adventures of Huckleberry Finn (1884), by American author and humorist, Mark Twain (Samuel Langhorne Clemens). Huckleberry Finn was portrayed to be about 12 or 13 years old, derived from Twain's boyhood friend, Tom Blankenship, as "ignorant, unwashed, insufficiently fed; but he had as good a heart as ever any boy had. His liberties were totally unrestricted. He was the only really independent person—boy or man—in the community, and by consequence, he was tranquilly and continuously happy and envied by the rest of us." The cartoon character that shares the same name as Mark Twain's character is Huckleberry "Huck" Hound, an anthropomorphic Bluetick Coonhound created by Hanna-Barbera in 1958, in which the term "huckleberry" can be a slang expression for a rube or an amateur, or a mild expression of disapproval.

Huckleberries hold a place in archaic American English slang. The phrase "a huckleberry over my persimmon" was used to mean "a bit beyond my abilities." On the other hand, "I'm your huckleberry" is a way of saying that one is just the right person for a given job or as a partner. The range of slang meanings of huckleberry in the 19th century was broad, also referring to significant persons or nice persons. Country singer Toby Keith co-wrote a song with Chuck Conner entitled Huckleberry about a primary school crush that turns into marriage later in life and they have 3 "little huckleberries" of their own, and is part of his album Unleashed.

See also 
 Vaccinium ovatum (known by the common names evergreen huckleberry, winter huckleberry, and California huckleberry)
 Cyrilla racemiflora (known as "he huckleberry" in the family of Cyrillaceae)
 Solanum scabrum, (known as "garden huckleberry" in the family Solanaceae)

References

Berries
Ericaceae
Garden plants of North America
Non-timber forest products
Plant common names
Plants used in Native American cuisine
Symbols of Idaho